The 1997 Jordan League was the 47th season of Jordan Premier League, the top-flight league for Jordanian association football clubs. The championship was won by Al-Wehdat, while Al-Baqa'a, and Al-Karmal were relegated. A total of 10 teams participated.

Teams

Map

League standings

References

Jordanian Pro League seasons
Jordan
Jordan
football